This is a list of winners and nominees for the Kids' Choice Award for Favorite Music Group, given at the Nickelodeon Kids' Choice Awards.

Winners and nominations

Groups with most wins
4 wins 
BTS

3 wins
The Black Eyed Peas
One Direction
Fifth Harmony

2 wins
Destiny’s Child
Green Day
Jonas Brothers

Groups with most nominations

10 nominations
Maroon 5

9 nominations 
The Black Eyed Peas

7 nominations
Jonas Brothers

6 nominations 
Backstreet Boys
Fall Out Boy

5 nominations 
Destiny’s Child
Imagine Dragons
OneRepublic

4 nominations 
BTS
*NSYNC
One Direction
The Chainsmokers

3 nominations 
Big Time Rush
Coldplay
Fifth Harmony
Green Day
Linkin Park
Twenty One Pilots

2 nominations 
Baha Men
Blackpink
B2K
Lady Antebellum
No Doubt
Panic! at the Disco
Pentatonix
Spice Girls
TLC

References

Favorite Music Group
American music awards